Brian A. Dixon (born April 19, 1980) is an American author, primarily of short fiction. He was born in Connecticut.  His first published short story, "The McMillen Golf Penalty," was awarded the Shannon Searles Fiction Prize by Connecticut Review in 2002.  He has since published short fiction in a number of outlets in addition to work on plays and novels.  Dixon served as the editor of Revelation magazine, an independent literary magazine about the apocalypse.  Columbia & Britannia (2009), an alternate history anthology edited by Brian A. Dixon and Adam Chamberlain, was nominated for the 2010 Sidewise Award for Alternate History. Dixon and Chamberlain are also the editors of Back to Frank Black (2012), a volume of original essays and interviews celebrating Chris Carter's Millennium.

References

External links

Locus Index to Science Fiction entry

American alternate history writers
Living people
1980 births